Lottia septiformis is a species of sea snail, a true limpet, a marine gastropod mollusk in the family Lottiidae, one of the families of true limpets.

Description
The length of the shell attains 14.5 mm.

Distribution
This marine species is endemic to Australia and occurs off New South Wales, Tasmania, Victoria and Western Australia.

References

 Nakano, T. & Ozawa, T. 2007. Worldwide phylogeography of limpets of the order Patellogastropoda: molecular, morphological and Palaeontological evidence. Journal of Molluscan Studies 73: 79–99 
 Trew, A. 1983. The Melvill-Tomlin Collection. Handlists of the Molluscan Collections in the Department of Zoology, National Museum of Wales. Parts 19, 20 & 21. Pleurotomariacea, Fissurellacea and Patellacea. National Museum of Wales, Cardiff.

External links
 Quoy J.R.C. & Gaimard J.P. (1832-1835). Voyage de découvertes de l'"Astrolabe" exécuté par ordre du Roi, pendant les années 1826-1829, sous le commandement de M. J. Dumont d'Urville. Zoologie. 1: i-l, 1-264; 2(1): 1-321 [1832; 2(2): 321-686 [1833]; 3(1): 1-366 [1834]; 3(2): 367-954 [1835]; Atlas (Mollusques): pls 1-93 [1833]. Paris: Tastu.]

Lottiidae
Gastropods described in 1834